Clarence G. Dow (October 2, 1854 – March 11, 1893) was a Major League Baseball outfielder. He played for the 1884 Boston Reds in the Union Association.  Dow appeared in one game for the Reds and had two hits in six at-bats. Dow along with Elvio Jiménez and Tom Pratt, are the only players to have six at-bats in their only MLB game.

References

External links

1854 births
1893 deaths
19th-century baseball players
Major League Baseball outfielders
Boston Reds (UA) players
Baseball players from Massachusetts